Around the World Under the Sea is a 1966 science fiction film directed by Andrew Marton and starring Lloyd Bridges, with Marshall Thompson, Shirley Eaton, Gary Merrill, and David McCallum. It follows the adventures of a crew of the deep-diving nuclear-powered civilian research submarine Hydronaut making a submerged circumnavigation of the world to plant monitoring sensors on the ocean floor that will help scientists better predict impending earthquakes. Although Jules Verne is not credited by the filmmakers, his influence can be seen throughout the film.

Plot

After the destruction of much of coastal Turkey, a United States led crew of experts from around the world pilots a five-person submarine, traveling the world oceans, planting sensors on the ocean floor to warn scientists of any impending earthquakes.

Along the way the crew must deal with underwater exploding volcanoes and giant eels. In addition, the crew often does not get along especially when a crewmember wants to use the submarine to reach a shipwreck that holds a safe containing diamonds and pearls. The mission was made necessary as tidal waves have been causing destruction all over the world.

Cast

Comic book adaptation
 Dell Movie Classic: Around the World Under the Sea (December 1966)

Reception
Moria gave the film 2 and 1/2 stars, praising the underwater camera work but finding the story lacking.  The Encyclopedia of Science Fiction found the movie hackneyed, but that the underwater sequences filmed by Ricou Browning to be good, Film Affinity found the movie to have its moments but that overall the movie was boring.

See also
List of American films of 1966

References

Bibliography
 Wingrove, David. Science Fiction Film Source Book (Longman Group Limited, 1985)

External links 
 
 

1966 films
1960s science fiction adventure films
1960s English-language films
Films about the United States Coast Guard
Films adapted into comics
Films directed by Andrew Marton
Films scored by Harry Sukman
Metro-Goldwyn-Mayer films
Science fiction submarine films
American science fiction adventure films
1960s American films